Adelosebastes is a monotypic genus of marine ray-finned fish belonging to the subfamily Sebastinae, the rockfishes, part of the family Scorpaenidae. The only species in this genus is Adelosebastes latens, the Aleutian scorpionfish. It is found in the northern Pacific Ocean.

Taxonomy
Adelosebastes was formally described as a genus in 1979 by the ichthyologists William N. Eschmeyer, Tokiharu Abe and Soji Nakano when they described its only speciesAdelosebastes latens. A. latens was described from types collected at the Emperor Seamounts  and the Aleutian Islands. The specific name, latens, means secret in Latin, again the authors did not explain this allusion but it is probably in line with their use of adelos in the genus name.

Description
Adelosebastes latens has 12 spines and 13 soft rays in its dorsal fin while the anal fin has 3 spines and 5 soft rays, the last ray being a double ray. The suborbital ridge has weak or no spines present and the pectoral fin may have two lobes. The overall colour in living specimens is bright crimson red, although this fades to yellowish in preserved specimens. In some specimens there may be dark markings on the nape and the back. There is normally a black mark on the rear of the gill cover and some black spots on the membranes of the dorsal and pectoral fins. There may also be three bands of indistinct black spots on the back.

Distribution and habitat
Adelosebastes latens is found in the northern Pacific Ocean and has been recorded from the length of the Emperor Sea Mount Chain, the most westerly and northern part of the Hawaiian–Emperor seamount chain which extends north from the western end of the Northwestern Hawaiian Islands to the Kuril–Kamchatka Trench. They are also found in the Aleutian Islands.

References

Sebastolobini
Taxa named by William N. Eschmeyer
Taxa named by Tokiharu Abe
Taxa named by Soji Nakano
Monotypic fish genera